Michael Paul John Williams (born 27 October 1986) is a Welsh footballer who plays for hometown club Colwyn Bay. He is a Wales under-21 international.

Club career
Williams, who is the older brother of fellow footballer Marc Williams, began his career as a trainee at Wrexham and signed professional terms in July 2005, when he was described by manager Denis Smith as "...quick, strong and has a good left foot." He made his first-team debut as a half-time substitute in a 4–1 defeat by Wycombe Wanderers in September 2005 and became an established player in the Wrexham back four, making 60 league appearances in three seasons and playing in the cup upsets at Sheffield Wednesday in August 2006 and Scunthorpe United in December 2006. In November 2006, Williams agreed a new contract keeping him at Wrexham until 2009. At the end of the 2009–10 season, Williams was released by Wrexham.

Williams is the third post-war player called Mike Williams to play for Wrexham. The first came through the youth system in the 1970s, with the second joining from Chester City in 1984.

In July 2010 he joined fellow Conference Premier outfit Kidderminster Harriers on trial and was handed a permanent one-year contract with the Aggborough Stadium club on 20 July. On 30 May 2012, he signed a new one-year contract.

He joined Conference North side Altrincham in 2013, securing promotion to the Conference with them via the play-offs in 2013–14. He was forced to retire in November 2014, at the age of 28, after being diagnosed with osteoarthritis in both hips. Williams came out of retirement in August 2015 after a successful pre-season with Welsh Premier League side Llandudno, playing alongside his brother Marc again.

He left Llandudno in the summer of 2018 and signed for Flint Town United. In October 2018, he signed for Bangor City.

International career
Williams made his debut for Wales U21 against Northern Ireland U21 in February 2006 and scored the winner on his second cap against Cyprus U21 in May 2006. He went on to make 13 appearances for Wales U21 in total, scoring two goals.

On 8 September 2009, he made his debut for the Wales semi-professional side during a 2–1 defeat to Poland.

Personal life
After leaving full-time football, Williams worked as a delivery driver. He later found work as a financial advisor.

Career statistics

References

External links

Living people
1986 births
People from Colwyn Bay
Sportspeople from Conwy County Borough
Welsh footballers
Wales youth international footballers
Wales under-21 international footballers
Wales semi-pro international footballers
Association football defenders
Wrexham A.F.C. players
Kidderminster Harriers F.C. players
Altrincham F.C. players
English Football League players
Colwyn Bay F.C. players
National League (English football) players
Llandudno F.C. players
Bangor City F.C. players
Cymru Premier players
Flint Town United F.C. players